is a passenger railway station located in the city of Hino, Tokyo, Japan, operated by East Japan Railway Company (JR East).

Lines
The station is 40.8 kilometers from Tokyo Station.

Station layout
The station consists of a single island platform serving two tracks. The station is staffed.

Platforms

History
Hino Station opened on 6 January 1890. With the privatization of Japanese National Railways (JNR) on 1 April 1987, the station came under the control of JR East.

Passenger statistics
In fiscal 2019, the station was used by an average of 26,916 passengers daily (boarding passengers only).

The passenger figures for previous years are as shown below.

Surrounding area
Hino City Hall
Hino Civic Center
Hino City Library
Hino City Central Community Center
Hino City Central Welfare Center
Hino Chuo Park

See also

 List of railway stations in Japan

References

External links

 JR East station information 

Chūō Main Line
Stations of East Japan Railway Company
Railway stations in Tokyo
Railway stations in Japan opened in 1890
Hino, Tokyo